The Reformed Episcopal Seminary is a private seminary in Blue Bell, Pennsylvania. It was founded in 1887 as the first seminary of the Reformed Episcopal Church.

History

The Reformed Episcopal Seminary was founded in 1887 in West Philadelphia, Pennsylvania, as the "Theological Seminary of the Reformed Episcopal Church", its chartered and legal name. The seminary was established based on the pledge of a trust created by Harriet Benson in March 1886. The corner stone for the first building to house the seminary was laid on September 19, 1886. The seminary began meeting for classes in 1886 under the tutelage of Bishop William Nicholson in his residence. It opened the doors to its first class of students on September 30, 1887, in its new building in West Philadelphia, Pennsylvania, as the seminary of the Reformed Episcopal Church, after the trust was received on March 16, 1887.

The Reformed Episcopal Seminary upholds the doctrinal statement adopted by the Reformed Episcopal Church. The doctrinal statement includes the Thirty-Nine Articles, the historic creeds, the historic Book of Common Prayer, and the Declaration of Principles. The term "Reformed" has various meanings within larger Christian community. For example, Presbyterians have expressed the reformed faith in the Westminster Confession of Faith, while Reformed Baptists have commonly expressed the reformed faith in the 1689 London Baptist Confession of Faith. The Reformed Episcopal Church was founded on the Thirty-Nine Articles as they express a summary of the necessary doctrines that brought about reformation in the Church of England. The founders of the Reformed Episcopal Church originally spell the name of the church as Re-formed, referring to the idea that it was the Re-organized Episcopal Church taken back to its historic faith. While later statements of faith have expanded and added to the doctrines expressed in the Articles, the Thirty-Nine Articles represent the necessary doctrine that defines the Protestant position against the Roman Catholic position of that period, and in unity with the reformations taking place elsewhere in Europe.

"Once in the early days our Church was referred to as the "Primitive Episcopal Church," and the name seems to fit its mission.  The word "Primitive" shows that it is a restoration, going back not only to the days of our country's early history, but back to the Reformation, when the fires of martyrdom and the horrors of torture could not drive away from the truth those who held it in their keeping; back still farther to the days of the apostles; aye back farther yet, to the teaching of Him who, beside the blue waters of Galilee, called followers into His service, that He might make them "fishers of men."

Administration 
Until 1982, the chief institutional officer of the seminary was the dean. Since then the primary institutional officers have been the president and the dean.

Campus

The old campus, which was built in 1887, was located at 43rd and Chestnut (West Philadelphia, Pennsylvania). The building served as both be the denominational cathedral and the seminary. In the 1980s, the seminary acquired the property next to the building, conducting most of its operations there while continuing to use the dormitory and worship space in the original building. The denominational cathedral, Christ Memorial Church, continued to use the original building for its congregation and a grade school. In an effort to adapt to changes in its student body throughout the 1990s (including an increase in second vocation night students), the seminary moved its classes and library to a church in Roxborough, Pennsylvania, which dramatically reduced the costs of maintaining and protecting the property. The church continued to use the original building and maintained partial ownership of the building. In 2001 the seminary built its own campus in Blue Bell, Pennsylvania. In 2004 the steeple of Christ Memorial Church was struck by lightning and severely damaged the building. After a two-year court battle with the insurance company, the church and seminary won some settlement money, but not enough to rebuild the structures. The building was sold to a developer and it was later demolished.

Academics
The seminary educates and trains Christians for lay and ordained ministries. It emphasizes a belief in the inerrancy of the Bible as the word of God, adherence to reformed theology and evangelical beliefs, worship and polity in the Anglican tradition, and pastoral ministry training. The seminary offers a Master of Divinity (M.Div.) degree program, a diploma program, two certificate programs, and a licentiate for diaconal minister program or deaconess ministry. It is on the quarter system and requires the completion of 150 credits for the master's degree.

In 2015 the school initiated an honors thesis program for select M.Div. students. High achieving students are invited by the faculty to write a thesis in their senior year which they are required to defend before a panel of faculty members.

Accreditation
The seminary was granted initial accreditation by the Association of Theological Schools in the United States and Canada, effective August 8, 2013. The Theological Commission of the Reformed Episcopal Church and the Anglican Church in North America have also both approved the Reformed Episcopal Seminary.

Mission
The charter of the seminary states that it was formed "for the purpose of educating and training men for the ministry of the Gospel of our Lord Jesus Christ especially in connection with the Reformed Episcopal Church and in accordance with the Constitution, Canons, rules, regulations, principles, Doctrine, and worship of said Church." Its mission statement declares that it seeks "to train Christ’s people to serve the flock of the Lord Jesus Christ through biblical, Anglican Worship, Example, and Discipleship as defined in the official standards of the Reformed Episcopal Church ... and to immerse students in Scripture, the historical and ancient traditions of the church, worship, and doctrine." The seminary emphasizes what they describe as "classical Anglicanism lived out in the world through worship, evangelism, and discipleship."

The seminary further describes itself as Evangelical, Catholic, Reformed, Ecumenical and Episcopal, defining the terms this way:

 Evangelical - proclaiming Jesus Christ as Savior and Lord;
 Catholic - affirming the faith of the apostles as expressed through the early creeds and liturgy;
 Reformed - holding the English Reformation doctrines of the primacy of Scripture and justification by grace through faith;
 Ecumenical - welcoming students from a variety of church groups and backgrounds;
 Episcopal - holding to the worship, doctrine, and order of the English Reformation.

Student body
As of 2018, the seminary had 21 students enrolled in their ministerial degree program. They came from a variety of traditions, including: African Methodist Episcopal, Anglican, Assemblies of God, Baptist, Church of God, Congregational, Lutheran, and Presbyterian. The seminary trains clergy candidates for the Reformed Episcopal Church, the Anglican Church in North America, as well as other churches traditions. The majority of the seminary's clergy candidates are Anglican.

Notable alumni 
 Milton C. Fisher – 1948 Bachelor of Divinity, dean, president, and Professor of Old Testament at Reformed Episcopal Seminary, NIV Bible Translation Committee member
 Daniel G. Cox – 1952 Bachelor of Divinity, Reformed Episcopal Church bishop, Reformed Episcopal Seminary board chairman
 Roy A. Clouser – 1962 Bachelor of Divinity, author and professor emeritus at The College of New Jersey
 Samuel Baraga – 1974 Master of Divinity, director, Bharat Bible College, Dabilpur India

See also
Reformed Episcopal Church#Seminaries

References

External links
Official website

Anglican Church in North America
Anglican seminaries and theological colleges
Seminaries and theological colleges in Pennsylvania
Anglican realignment
Religious organizations established in 1886
Anglicanism in the United States
Anglican organizations established in the 19th century
Universities and colleges in Philadelphia